The following list is a list of ethnolinguistic regions of South Asia. An ethnolinguistic region indicates a region of people that are united by a common language and ethnicity. South Asia is the southern region of the Asian continent, consisting mostly of the Indian subcontinent and sub-Himalayan countries, including, Bangladesh, Bhutan, Maldives, Nepal, India, Pakistan and Sri Lanka. The population of South Asia is about 1.749 billion, putting it as the most populated region in the world. The region is very linguistically diverse, with India alone having over 780 languages.

Anga

Assam

Balochistan

Baltistan

Bengal (Bangla)

Chittagonian

Sylhet

Bhil Pradesh

Bodoland

Chitral

Chittagong (Chattogram)

Garhwal

Gujarat

Hazarajat

Hindustani Belt

Subregions

Awadh

Bagar

Bagelkhand

Bhojpur-Purvanchal

Braj (Brijbhoomi)

Bundelkhand

Chhattisgarh

Chota Nagpur

Dhundhar

Hadoti

Haryana

Kannauj

Magadha

Malwa

Marwar

Mewar

Mewat

Nimar

Rohilkhand

Shekhawati

Tharparkar

Indus Kohistan

Jammu

Kalasha Desh

Karnataka

Kashmir

Kerala

Konkan

Kumaon

Kutch (Kachchh)

Ladakh

Maharashtra

Mithila

Subregions

Bajjikanchal

Note :- Some people consider Bajjika to be a dialect of Maithili while some others consider it to be a separate language.

Kosi—Seemanchal

Nuristan

Odisha

Pashtunistan (Pakhtunkhwa)

Punjab

Sindh

Sinhala

Tamil Nadu

Telugu Desam (Telugu Nadu)

Tulu Nadu (Tulu Nad)

See also
 List of indigenous peoples of South Asia

References

South Asia
Asia-related lists
 
 
Demographics of India
Asia